Nomad Hockey Club, commonly referred to as Nomad Astana, is a farm team of the Barys Astana of the Kontinental Hockey League (KHL). Founded in 2007 as Barys Astana–2, the team changed its name to Nomad Astana in 2013. Formerly a member of the Supreme Hockey League, Nomad currently play in the Kazakhstan Hockey Championship.

History
The team formed in 2007 to play in the Pervaya Liga. They finished in 14th place in the Ural–Western Siberia Zone. Next season, they joined the Kazakhstan Hockey Championship. Squaded by junior players, they finished in last place in their first season of play. Next season, they qualified for the playoffs for the first time. Strengthened by players from the Barys Astana, they reached finals. However they lost to Beibarys Atyrau in four games in series.

On 31 May 2019 it was announced that Nomand would be leaving the Kazakh league, and would be joining the VHL for the 2019-20 season. Alongside Nomand, Dynamo Tver, Torpedo-Gorky Nizhny Novgorod and Uzbekistans's Humo Tashkent would also be joining the league.

Season-by-season record
Note: GP = Games played, W = Wins, L = Losses, OTW = Overtime/shootout wins, OTL = Overtime/shootout losses, Pts = Points, GF = Goals for, GA = Goals against

Achievements
Kazakhstan Hockey Championship:
Winners (1): 2016–17
Runners-up (1): 2010–11
IIHF Continental Cup:
Runners-up (1): 2017–18

Head coaches
Yuri Mikhailis 2009–10
Galym Mambetaliyev 2010–11
Yuri Mikhailis 2011–12
Alexander Vysotsky 2013–14
Yuri Mikhailis 2014–20
Alexander Vysotsky 2020–

References

External links
Official page

Ice hockey teams in Astana